Jean-Louis Rouméguère (20 June 1863, Auch – 25 November 1925, Auch) was a French landscape painter.

References 

French landscape painters
19th-century French painters
20th-century French painters
20th-century French male artists
People from Auch
1863 births
1925 deaths
19th-century French male artists